Euseius consors is a species of mite in the family Phytoseiidae.

References

consors
Articles created by Qbugbot
Animals described in 1962